Celso Yunes Portiolli (born 1 June  1967) is a television presenter, broadcaster, businessman, YouTuber, former comedian, former politician and former television writer, hired by SBT, he is the presenter of the programs Domingo alegre and Show do Milhão. Portiolli is also the owner of the radio station Optimal FM, which has three stations in the interior of the state of São Paulo.

He began his radio career in 1984, working at stations in Paraná, Minas Gerais, Mato Grosso do Sul and São Paulo. In Ponta Porã, he became audience leader and director of a local radio station. His popularity was so great in the city that in 1992, aged 24, he was elected councilor with one of the highest votes in the municipality.

Career 
Portiolli's dream has always been to appear on the small screen. Therefore, in 1993, he sent a tape to Silvio Santos, with hidden camera suggestions for Topa Tudo por Dinheiro. Of the 11 ideas he sent, 7 were approved, which aroused the interest of Sistema Brasileiro de Televisão, which soon invited him to work as a writer for the program.

Later, in 1996, the opportunity arose to command Passa ou Repassa, replacing Angélica. The attraction remained on the air until 1998 and returned to the grid a year later until 2000. In 2001, Celso presented other programs, such as Tempo de Alegria, Xaveco and Fantasia. The following year, came one of his biggest hits, Curtindo uma Viagem , the audience leader in 2002. In 2003, he led a reality show called O Conquistador do Fim do Mundo. At the end of 2004, he was in charge of Sessão Premiada, a program in which he interacted with viewers by telephone and gave cash prizes. Portiolli alternated between being runner-up and leading the audience on Saturday afternoons.

The following year, he was invited to lead the Fama Code, an attraction that chose the best child singer in the country and entered him in a final with children from various Latin American countries that took place in Mexico.

In the following years, he hosted several programs such as Charme, Namoro na TV, Curtindo com Reais, Curtindo com Crianças and Ver para Crer. In 2009, Portiolli took over the presentation of Domingo Legal in place of Gugu Liberato, who transferred to Rede Record. In 2015, after Domingo Legal lost two hours of duration, SBT decided to create another program for Celso, this time on Saturday nights, with the name Sabadão com Celso Portiolli, a program that yielded reasonable ratings. In early 2017 the program was taken off the air after almost 2 years.

After 12 years, SBT returned to show Show do Milhão, in September 2021. The program airs on Friday nights, Celso was chosen to present the program.

In March 2016 he debuted his YouTube channel which, in 4 months, reached the mark of 1 million subscribers.

Personal life 
Portiolli married Suzana Marchi in 1992. As a result of their marriage, they have three children: Laura Portiolli (born in 2000), Pedro Henrique Portiolli (2003) and Luana Portiolli (2006).

In December 2021 Portiolli received treatment for bladder cancer and is cured.

Filmography

TV shows

Specials

Awards and nominations

References

External links 

 

1967 births
Living people
People from Maringá
Brazilian people of Italian descent
Brazilian television presenters
Brazilian broadcasters